Chung Mong-hun (September 14, 1948 – August 4, 2003) was the 5th son of Chung Ju-yung, the founder of the South Korean Hyundai conglomerate. After the death of his father, he took over part of his father's role and became the chairman of Hyundai Asan, the company in charge of various business ventures between North and South Korea. He committed suicide in 2003.

Professional career
Chung Mong-hun joined Hyundai Heavy Industries in 1975, becoming president of the company's shipping interests by 1981. His father, Hyundai Group founder Chung Ju-yung, was impressed by his management style and put him in charge of the company's electronics division in 1982.

In 1997, Chung Ju-yung appointed Mong-hun as the group's co-chairman. In 2000, after Ju-yung's eldest son, Mong-koo, attempted to oust Mong-hun, Ju-yung made Mong-hun the group's sole chairman. Later that year, Ju-yung announced that he and his sons would resign from all management positions at Hyundai companies, except Mong-hun would remain the chair of Hyundai Asan. However, Mong-koo remained the chairman of Hyundai Motors and Kia Motors.

Chung Mong-hun was appointed by his father, who was born in Japan-controlled North Korea, to handle Hyundai business with the government of North Korea. He took pride in this position, and reportedly decorated his office with photographs of Hyundai officials meeting with Kim Jong Il in Pyongyang, as well as photos of himself showing Kim around a North Korean resort that Hyundai operated.

Scandal and suicide
In June 2003, Chung was indicted for his role in the "cash-for-summit scandal" on charges of doctoring company books to hide the secret money transfers of millions of dollars by the Kim Dae-jung administration to North Korea to set up the 2000 inter-Korean summit. Facing up to three years in prison after he was forced to testify in court about the money transfer days earlier, he committed suicide on August 4, 2003, by leaping from his 12th floor office.

Family

References

1948 births
2003 deaths
South Korean Buddhists
20th-century South Korean businesspeople
Suicides by jumping in South Korea
Yonsei University alumni
Hyundai Group
Hyundai people